Mahara Okeroa (born 1946) is a former New Zealand politician of the New Zealand Labour Party. He represented the Te Tai Tonga Māori electorate as a Member of Parliament from 1999 to 2008.

Early life and career 
Okeroa was born in Waitara, Taranaki and grew up in Parihaka. He has iwi affiliations to Te Ātiawa, Ngāti Maniapoto, Taranaki, Ngāti Ruanui and Ngā Rauru. He trained and worked as a teacher before joining the Ministry of Education as a Māori education advisor and Te Puni Kōkiri as director for the Taranaki region.

Member of Parliament 

Okeroa contested Te Tai Tonga, the Māori electorate covering the South Island and Wellington city, for the Labour Party at the 1999 general election. He was successful, defeating the incumbent Tu Wyllie of the New Zealand First Party. Okeroa held the electorate in 2002 and 2005.

In his first term as an MP, Okeroa was deputy chair of the Social Services select committee and a member of the Māori Affairs committee. In his second term, he was chair of the Māori Affairs committee and a member of the law and order committee. From July 2004, he held additional appointments as parliamentary under-secretary to the Minister of Māori Affairs and to the Minister of Education.

After the 2005 general election, Okeroa was appointed a minister outside of Cabinet holding associate ministerial portfolios for Arts, Culture and Heritage; Conservation and Social Development and Employment.

In the 2008 general election, Rahui Katene of the Māori Party out-polled Okeroa by a margin of 1,049 votes. Okeroa's party list placement of 40 meant he was not able to immediately be elected as a list MP. He declined to re-enter Parliament as a list MP after the resignation of Darren Hughes in 2011 and did not stand for the general election later that year. He was succeeded as Labour's Te Tai Tonga candidate by Rino Tirikatene.

Post-parliamentary career 
Okeroa was elected to the Port Nicholson Block Settlement Trust in 2009 and succeeded Sir Ngātata Love as chair in October 2012 after the latter was removed, following a Serious Fraud Office investigation. Okeroa held the chair until October 2013 when he was replaced by Neville Baker. Okeroa's resignation from the Trust was announced the following year.

He has also been a trustee of the Wellington Tenths Trust.

External links 
 Parliamentary website page

References

1946 births
Living people
New Zealand Labour Party MPs
Members of the Cabinet of New Zealand
New Zealand schoolteachers
New Zealand MPs for Māori electorates
People from Waitara, New Zealand
People educated at Opunake High School
Members of the New Zealand House of Representatives
Unsuccessful candidates in the 2008 New Zealand general election
21st-century New Zealand politicians